The Biz Radio Network was a Texas-based radio network that owns three AM radio stations.

Content 

The Biz Radio Network consisted of three stations, the newest being AM 1130 San Antonio. Most of the audience listened online, by downloaded podcast from iTunes, and on the website, BizRadio.com. A November 2009 Houston Chronicle article reported that BizRadio was also heard in Denver and Colorado Springs. The network featured news and analysis, with an emphasis on personal finance. Business subjects were covered under the tagline "The Sound of Your Money Growing".

The network's content consisted heavily of market analysis. The most popular program was the weekly Genius Meets Streetsmarts, featuring Arthur Laffer and Dan Frishberg, who also hosted The MoneyMan Report. The network catered to high-income individuals, referred to by the network as "The Union of People Who Use Their Brains To Get A Better Deal", who spend on luxury items yet desire to maintain their "nest egg" by spending their money wisely.

The program director was network co-founder Elisea Frishberg, author of How Impact Marketing Can Make You Rich.

Among the featured programs were Lifestyles Unlimited, presented by Del Walmsley, The Ray Lucia Show, and The Moneyman Report with Dan Frishberg.
The network stated that its audience consisted of 61% men and 39% women, with nearly half (48%) in the over-55 category, 43% with college degrees and 33% with a higher degree, and over two thirds with net income exceeding $50,000. Thirty percent of the audience had a net worth of $1 million or more, with incomes around three times the average income in its broadcast cities.

Audience
The station management said that they had never sought high ratings, but quality programming and the information most entertaining and useful to the network's small but affluent audience, which represented a small proportion of the population, but controlled the majority of wealth. The Houston Chronicle wrote of the network's flagship station AM 1110 Houston that: "Though tiny in numbers, there are more people with advanced degrees, million dollar net worth, $50,000 cars, million-dollar homes, and decision-making jobs listening to Biz Radio than the whole rest of the radio dial combined".

Biz Radio lost $1.6 Million between January and August 2009, although performance improved considerably with an injection of capital from several media partners. Biz Radio programs were aired through syndication on business stations around the country.

In 2012, Biz Radio Network went off the air, and the remaining affiliates switched to similar business programming. The official website was shut down and their domain is up for sale.

SEC settlement 

In November 2009, the Securities and Exchange Commission (SEC) alleged that Albert Kaleta and his firm Kaleta Capital Management sold $10 Million promissory notes to investors, the proceeds of which were to be lent to small businesses at 12 to 14 percent interest. Instead, the SEC alleged, the money was used to prop up the ailing Biz Radio Network and a related investment advisory firm, Daniel Frishberg Financial Services (DFFS).

As a result of these regulatory issues, Kaleta's interest was bought back by the company. Kaleta is also alleged to have used investors' money to pay $1.6 million in personal expenses, including $10,000/monthly credit card bills and a Mercedes. Kaleta denied the allegations of improper use of the money. These allegations were never proven and were not part of Kaleta's settlement with the SEC. Kaleta signed a consent order neither admitting nor denying wrongdoing, and while the radio network and DFFS were not accused of wrongdoing by the SEC, both the radio network and Frishberg's investment firm will need to repay the investors, as do all other borrowers.

Affiliates before closure 
 KTEK, 1110 AM, Houston (2.5 kW)
 KTMR, 1130 AM, Edna (Victoria) (10 kW)

References

Defunct radio networks in the United States
Companies based in Houston
Radio stations established in 2005
Radio stations disestablished in 2012
Defunct radio stations in the United States